Brunei participated in the 2010 Asian Para Games–First Asian Para Games in Guangzhou, China from 13 to 19 December 2010. Athletes from Brunei won four medals, and finished 25th in the medal table.

References

Nations at the 2010 Asian Para Games
Para
Brunei at the Asian Para Games